San Pietro extra moenia is an ancient Roman Catholic church in Spoleto, Umbria, Italy. Remarkable examples of Romanesque sculpture adorn the facade. The term extra moenia refers to its location outside the city walls.

The site was once an ancient cemetery (necropolis), but a church dedicated to St Peter was founded in the 5th-century, to house the chains that supposedly once bound the saint. The present structure was built between the 12th and 13th centuries. The facade is floridly decorated with ornamental figures, animals, and reliefs. Some of the scenes related events in the life of the saint, while others are moral tales, for example, a deer battling a snake.

References

Spoleto
Churches in Spoleto
Romanesque architecture in Spoleto